The Fortress of Niha (also called Cave of Tyron in Frankish sources and Chquif Tayroun in Arabic sources) is an ancient fortress in Lebanon, which has been first mentioned in 975 AD. It is located in the municipality of Niha Chouf in Lebanon, and is today visited as cultural heritage in the Shouf Cedar Nature Reserve.

Carved into the rock of a cliff overlooking the Bisri and 'Aray valley, the Fortress of Niha has been monitoring the road between Sidon and the Beqaa valley. It is mentioned for the first time in 975 AD and later in 1133. It has been controlled alternatively by the Crusaders and local Muslims until its destruction in 1261. In 1270, the Mamluk leader Baibars ordered it rebuilt. In 1585, the Emir Qorqomaz Maan probably took refuge in it briefly before his death. It is reputed that the Emir Fakhr-al-Din II also found refuge there before he was executed by the Pasha of Damascus in 1635, but it might more probably have been his father Emir Korkomaz, in 1584.

Shaped like a cave over a hundred meters deep, the fortress features chambers and rooms which were dug in order to shelter the soldiers and as depots for domestic work. Water resources were provided both by a rain collecting system and through a pipe from the 'Ain el-Halquoum spring. It also had a considerable number of silos for storing provisions.
The fortress was well fortified and enclosed in a wall pierced with openings. Several levels of habitations were leaning against the cliff and built using beams which were based on the rock and rested on the cliff wall.

See also
 Lordship of the Schuf

References 

 Shouf Biosphere Reserve official brochure, as available in March 2013).

Caves of Lebanon
Chouf District
Tourism in Lebanon
Tourist attractions in Lebanon